Barossa Council is a local government area in the Barossa Valley in South Australia. The council area covers 912 square kilometres and had a population of over 23,000 as at the 2016 Census.

History
It was proclaimed on 1 July 1996 following the amalgamation of the District Council of Angaston, the District Council of Barossa and the District Council of Tanunda. It also gained a portion of the former District Council of Mount Pleasant on 1 July 1997.

Description
Townships in the council area include
 Angaston
 Eden Valley
 Lyndoch
 Moculta
 Mount Pleasant
 Nuriootpa
 Penrice
 Springton
 Stockwell
 Tanunda
 Williamstown

Mayors
 Brian Hurn - 1996-2014
 Bob Sloane - 2014-2018
 Michael "Bim" Lange - 2018 - present

See also
List of parks and gardens in rural South Australia
 Hoffnungsthal, South Australia

References

External links
Official website
Local Government Association

Local government areas of South Australia
Barossa Valley